The Law and Order Party was a pro-slavery political party founded October 3, 1855 in Leavenworth, Kansas during the Bleeding Kansas period.

Founders of the party included David Rice Atchison and Joseph C. Anderson.

Eleven members of the Bogus Legislature aligned themselves with the Law and Order Party: W.G. Mathias, Richard R. Rees, D.A.N. Grover, Andrew McDonald, William Barbee, W.P. Richardson, John H. Stringfellow, Lucien Eastin, S.A. Williams, Archibald Payne, and Joseph C. Anderson.

References 

Bleeding Kansas
Political parties established in 1855
Defunct political parties in the United States